Sarchehan County is in Fars province, Iran. The capital of the county is the city of Korehi. At the 2006 census, the county's population (as Sarchehan District of Bavanat County) was 18,933 in 4,569 households. The following census in 2011 counted 22,492 people in 6,074 households. At the 2016 census, the district's population was 23,129 in 7,177 households. It was separated from Bavanat County in 2018 to form Sarchehan County.

Administrative divisions

The population history and structural changes of Sarchehan County's administrative divisions over three consecutive censuses are shown in the following table.

References

 

Counties of Fars Province